The canton of Landivisiau is an administrative division of the Finistère department, northwestern France. Its borders were modified at the French canton reorganisation which came into effect in March 2015. Its seat is in Landivisiau.

It consists of the following communes:
 
Bodilis
Commana
Guiclan
Guimiliau
Lampaul-Guimiliau
Landivisiau
Loc-Eguiner
Locmélar
Plougar
Plougourvest
Plounéventer
Plouvorn
Plouzévédé
Saint-Derrien
Saint-Sauveur
Saint-Servais
Saint-Vougay
Sizun
Trézilidé

References

Cantons of Finistère